A lawyer is a person who practices law. The role of a lawyer varies greatly across different legal jurisdictions. A lawyer can be classified as an advocate, attorney, barrister, canon lawyer, civil law notary, counsel, counselor, solicitor, legal executive, or public servant — with each role having different functions and privileges. Working as a lawyer generally involves the practical application of abstract legal theories and knowledge to solve specific problems. Some lawyers also work primarily in advancing the interests of the law and legal profession.

Terminology
Different legal jurisdictions have different requirements in the determination of who is recognized as being a lawyer. As a result, the meaning of the term "lawyer" may vary from place to place.

Some jurisdictions have two types of lawyers, barrister and solicitors, while others fuse the two. A barrister (also known as an advocate or counselor in some jurisdictions) is a lawyer who typically specializes in arguing before courts, particularly in higher courts. A solicitor (or attorney) is a lawyer who is trained to prepare cases and give advice on legal subjects. Depending on jurisdiction, solicitors can also represent people in lower courts but do not ordinarily have rights of audience in higher courts. Both solicitors and barristers are trained in law. However, in jurisdictions where there is a split profession, only barristers are admitted as members of a bar association.

The distinction between barristers and solicitors originated in the English legal system, but many countries which have adopted English law have eliminated the distinction. Countries such as New Zealand, Canada (with the exception of Quebec, which practices civil law), India, Pakistan, and the US have adopted a fused profession, where all lawyers have the privileges of both barristers and solicitors.

Some fused-profession jurisdictions use one term to describe lawyers generally. For example, the US lawyers are typically referred to as "attorneys", while Indian and Pakistani lawyers are known as "advocates". Other fused jurisdictions use terms such as "barrister and solicitor" or "attorney and counselor" to describe lawyers in general.

Nonetheless, the terminology of "barrister" and "solicitor" may still be applied to lawyers who deal in the specific kinds of work barristers and solicitors generally do. In countries like the US, however, the term "trial lawyer" typically describes the work of a lawyer who specialises primarily in arguing cases.

Nonetheless, in countries like England, Wales, Australia, and South Africa, the distinction between barristers and solicitors remain. Additionally, England and Wales has a number of other classifications of lawyers, which include registered foreign lawyers, patent attorneys, trademark attorneys, licensed conveyancers, public notaries, commissioners for oaths, immigration advisers and chartered legal executives. Under the English Legal Services Act 2007, "lawyer" is not a protected title. In other jurisdictions, like the United States, there are strict restrictions on who may call themselves a lawyer, with paralegals and patent agents generally disallowed.

Responsibilities
In most countries, particularly civil law countries, there has been a tradition of giving many legal tasks to a variety of civil law notaries, clerks, and scriveners. These countries do not have "lawyers" in the American sense, insofar as that term refers to a single type of general-purpose legal services provider; rather, their legal professions consist of a large number of different kinds of law-trained persons, known as jurists, some of whom are advocates who are licensed to practice in the courts. It is difficult to formulate accurate generalizations that cover all the countries with multiple legal professions because each country has traditionally had its own peculiar method of dividing up legal work among all its different types of legal professionals.

Notably, England, the mother of the common law jurisdictions, emerged from the Middle Ages with similar complexity in its legal professions, but then evolved by the 19th century to a single division between barristers and solicitors. An equivalent division developed between advocates and procurators in some civil law countries; these two types did not always monopolize the practice of law, in that they coexisted with civil law notaries.

Several countries that originally had two or more legal professions have since fused or united their professions into a single type of lawyer. Most countries in this category are common law countries, though France, a civil law country, merged its jurists in 1990 and 1991 in response to Anglo-American competition. In countries with fused professions, a lawyer is usually permitted to carry out all or nearly all the responsibilities listed below.

Oral argument in the courts

Arguing a client's case before a judge or jury in a court of law is the traditional province of the barrister in England and Australia, and of advocates in some civil law jurisdictions. However, the boundary between barristers and solicitors has evolved. In England today, the barrister monopoly covers only appellate courts, and barristers must compete directly with solicitors in many trial courts. In countries like the United States, which have fused legal professions, there are trial lawyers who specialize in trying cases in court, but trial lawyers do not have a legal monopoly like barristers. In some countries, litigants have the option of arguing pro se, or on their own behalf. It is common for litigants to appear unrepresented before certain courts like small claims courts; indeed, many such courts do not allow lawyers to speak for their clients, in an effort to save money for all participants in a small case. In other countries, like Venezuela, no one may appear before a judge unless represented by a lawyer. The advantage of the latter regime is that lawyers are familiar with the court's customs and procedures, and make the legal system more efficient for all involved. Unrepresented parties often damage their own credibility or slow the court down as a result of their inexperience.

Research and drafting of court papers
Often, lawyers brief a court in writing on the issues in a case before the issues can be orally argued. They may have to perform extensive research into relevant facts. Also, they draft legal papers and prepare for an oral argument.

In England, the usual division of labor is that a solicitor will obtain the facts of the case from the client and then brief a barrister (usually in writing). The barrister then researches and drafts the necessary court pleadings (which will be filed and served by the solicitor) and orally argues the case.

In Spain, the procurator merely signs and presents the papers to the court, but it is the advocate who drafts the papers and argues the case.

In some countries, like Japan, a scrivener or clerk may fill out court forms and draft simple papers for laypersons who cannot afford or do not need attorneys, and advise them on how to manage and argue their own cases.

Advocacy (written and oral) in administrative hearings
In most developed countries, the legislature has granted original jurisdiction over highly technical matters to executive branch administrative agencies which oversee such things. As a result, some lawyers have become specialists in administrative law. In a few countries, there is a special category of jurists with a monopoly over this form of advocacy; for example, France formerly had conseils juridiques (who were merged into the main legal profession in 1991). In other countries, like the United States, lawyers have been effectively barred by statute from certain types of administrative hearings in order to preserve their informality.

Client intake and counseling (with regard to pending litigation)
An important aspect of a lawyer's job is developing and managing relationships with clients (or the client's employees, if the lawyer works in-house for a government or corporation). The client-lawyer relationship is explained in six steps. First, the relationship begins with an intake interview where the lawyer gets to know the client personally. The second step is discovering the facts of the client's case. Thirdly is clarifying what the client wants to accomplish.  The fourth step is where the lawyer shapes the client's expectations as to what actually can be accomplished. The second to last step begins to develop various claims or defenses for the client. Lastly, the lawyer explains her or his fees to the client.

In England, only solicitors were traditionally in direct contact with the client. The solicitor retained a barrister if one was necessary and acted as an intermediary between the barrister and the client. In most cases barristers were obliged, under what is known as the "cab rank rule", to accept instructions for a case in an area in which they held themselves out as practicing, at a court at which they normally appeared and at their usual rates.

Legal advice

Legal advice is the application of abstract principles of law to the concrete facts of the client's case to advise the client about what they should do next. In many countries, only a properly licensed lawyer may provide legal advice to clients for good consideration, even if no lawsuit is contemplated or is in progress. Therefore, even conveyancers and corporate in-house counsel must first get a license to practice, though they may actually spend very little of their careers in court. Failure to obey such a rule is the crime of the unauthorized practice of law.

In other countries, jurists who hold law degrees are allowed to provide legal advice to individuals or to corporations, and it is irrelevant if they lack a license and cannot appear in court. Some countries go further; in England and Wales, there is no general prohibition on the giving of legal advice.  Singapore does not have any admission requirements for in-house counsel.  Sometimes civil law notaries are allowed to give legal advice, as in Belgium.

In many countries, non-jurist accountants may provide what is technically legal advice in tax and accounting matters.

Protecting intellectual property
In virtually all countries, patents, trademarks, industrial designs and other forms of intellectual property must be formally registered with a government agency in order to receive maximum protection under the law. The division of such work among lawyers, licensed non-lawyer jurists/agents, and ordinary clerks or scriveners varies greatly from one country to the next.

The trend in industrialized countries since the 1970s has been to greatly restrict the role of clerks and scriveners in patent and trademark work, and to require these functions to be performed only by lawyers or other licensed agents. This ensures that all work product in such cases receives the full protection of attorney-client privilege.

In the United States, for example, the Patent and Trademark Office (PTO) may not speak with anyone but the applicant's attorney about pending applications, and all documents filed in connection with a pending application are automatically accorded attorney-client privilege. The European Patent Office has a similar policy.

In contrast, many countries in the world do not recognize attorney-client privilege for work product related to intellectual property, or have only very limited recognition of the privilege. These countries include China, Japan, Korea, much of Southeast Asia, and most of Latin America. As a result, great care must be taken in these countries to protect intellectual property, as any work product related to a pending application may be disclosed to the public.

Many companies choose to file their applications in the United States or Europe first, and then file for protection in other countries where attorney-client privilege is not recognized. This allows them to keep their work product confidential while they are still in the process of perfecting their invention or design.

Negotiating and drafting contracts 
In some countries, the negotiating and drafting of contracts is considered to be similar to the provision of legal advice, so that it is subject to the licensing requirement explained above. In others, jurists or notaries may negotiate or draft contracts.

Lawyers in some civil law countries traditionally deprecated "transactional law" or "business law" as beneath them. French law firms developed transactional departments only in the 1990s when they started to lose business to international firms based in the United States and the United Kingdom (where solicitors have always done transactional work).

Conveyancing
Conveyancing is the drafting of the documents necessary for the transfer of real property, such as deeds and mortgages. In some jurisdictions, all real estate transactions must be carried out by a lawyer (or a solicitor where that distinction still exists). Such a monopoly is quite valuable from the lawyer's point of view; historically, conveyancing accounted for about half of English solicitors' income (though this has since changed), and a 1978 study showed that conveyancing "accounts for as much as 80 percent of solicitor-client contact in New South Wales." In most common law jurisdictions outside of the United States, this monopoly arose from an 1804 law that was introduced by William Pitt the Younger as a quid pro quo for the raising of fees on the certification of legal professionals such as barristers, solicitors, attorneys, and notaries.

In others, the use of a lawyer is optional and banks, title companies, or realtors may be used instead. In some civil law jurisdictions, real estate transactions are handled by civil law notaries. In England and Wales a special class of legal professionals–the licensed conveyancer–is also allowed to carry out conveyancing services for reward.

Carrying out the intent of the deceased
In many countries, only lawyers have the legal authority to draft wills, trusts, and any other documents that ensure the efficient disposition of a person's property after death. In some civil law countries, this responsibility is handled by civil law notaries.

In the United States, the estates of the deceased must generally be administered by a court through probate. American lawyers have a profitable monopoly on dispensing advice about probate law (which has been heavily criticized).

Prosecution and defense of criminal suspects
In many civil law countries, prosecutors are trained and employed as part of the judiciary; they are law-trained jurists, but may not necessarily be lawyers in the sense that the word is used in the common law world. In common law countries, prosecutors are usually lawyers holding regular licenses who simply happen to work for the government office that files criminal charges against suspects. Criminal defense lawyers specialize in the defense of those charged with any crimes.

Education

The educational prerequisites for becoming a lawyer vary greatly from country to country. In some countries, law is taught by a faculty of law, which is a department of a university's general undergraduate college. Law students in those countries pursue a Master or Bachelor of Laws degree. In some countries it is common or even required for students to earn another bachelor's degree at the same time. It is often followed by a series of advanced examinations, apprenticeships, and additional coursework at special government institutes.

In other countries, particularly the UK and U.S.A., law is primarily taught at law schools.  In America, the American Bar Association decides which law schools to approve and thereby which ones are deemed  most respectable. In England and Wales, the Bar Professional Training Course (BPTC) must be taken to have the right to work and be named as a barrister. Students who decide to pursue a non-law subject at degree level can instead study the Graduate Diploma in Law (GDL) after their degrees, before beginning the Legal Practice Course (LPC) or BPTC. In the United States and countries following the American model, (such as Canada with the exception of the province of Quebec) law schools are graduate/professional schools where a bachelor's degree is a prerequisite for admission. Most law schools are part of universities but a few are independent institutions. Law schools in the United States and Canada (with the exception of McGill University) award graduating students a J.D. (Juris Doctor/Doctor of Jurisprudence) (as opposed to the Bachelor of Laws) as the practitioner's law degree. Many schools also offer post-doctoral law degrees such as the LL.M (Legum Magister/Master of Laws), or the S.J.D. (Scientiae Juridicae Doctor/Doctor of Juridical Science) for students interested in advancing their research knowledge and credentials in a specific area of law.

The methods and quality of legal education vary widely. Some countries require extensive clinical training in the form of apprenticeships or special clinical courses. Others, like Venezuela, do not. A few countries prefer to teach through assigned readings of judicial opinions (the casebook method) followed by intense in-class cross-examination by the professor (the Socratic method). Many others have only lectures on highly abstract legal doctrines, which forces young lawyers to figure out how to actually think and write like a lawyer at their first apprenticeship (or job). Depending upon the country, a typical class size could range from five students in a seminar to five hundred in a giant lecture room. In the United States, law schools maintain small class sizes, and as such, grant admissions on a more limited and competitive basis.

Some countries, particularly industrialized ones, have a traditional preference for full-time law programs, while in developing countries, students often work full- or part-time to pay the tuition and fees of their part-time law programs.

Law schools in developing countries share several common problems, such as an over reliance on practicing judges and lawyers who treat teaching as a part-time hobby (and a concomitant scarcity of full-time law professors); incompetent faculty with questionable credentials; and textbooks that lag behind the current state of the law by two or three decades.

Earning the right to practice law

Some jurisdictions grant a "diploma privilege" to certain institutions, so that merely earning a degree or credential from those institutions is the primary qualification for practicing law. Mexico allows anyone with a law degree to practice law. However, in a large number of countries, a law student must pass a bar examination (or a series of such examinations) before receiving a license to practice. In a handful of U.S. states, one may become an attorney (a so-called country lawyer) by simply "reading law" and passing the bar examination, without having to attend law school first (although very few people actually become lawyers that way).

Some countries require a formal apprenticeship with an experienced practitioner, while others do not. For example, in South Africa it is required that in addition to obtaining an LL.B degree that person has to complete a year of pupillage under an experienced Advocate and have to be admitted to the bar to practice as an Advocate. Holders of an LL.B must have completed two years of clerkship under a principal Attorney (known as Articles) and passed all four board exams to be admitted as an "Attorney" and refer to themselves as such. A few jurisdictions still allow an apprenticeship in place of any kind of formal legal education (though the number of persons who actually become lawyers that way is increasingly rare).

Some countries, such as Singapore, do not have any admission requirements for in-house counsel.

Career structure

The career structure of lawyers varies widely from one country to the next.

Common law/civil law
In most common law countries, especially those with fused professions, lawyers have many options over the course of their careers. Besides private practice, they can become a prosecutor, government counsel, corporate in-house counsel, administrative law judge, judge, arbitrator, or law professor. There are also many non-legal jobs for which legal training is good preparation, such as politician, corporate executive, government administrator, investment banker, entrepreneur, or journalist. In developing countries like India, a large majority of law students never actually practice, but simply use their law degree as a foundation for careers in other fields.

In most civil law countries, lawyers generally structure their legal education around their chosen specialty; the boundaries between different types of lawyers are carefully defined and hard to cross. After one earns a law degree, career mobility may be severely constrained. For example, unlike their American counterparts, it is difficult for German judges to leave the bench and become advocates in private practice. Another interesting example is France, where for much of the 20th century, all judiciary officials were graduates of an elite professional school for judges. Although the French judiciary has begun experimenting with the Anglo-American model of appointing judges from accomplished advocates, the few advocates who have actually joined the bench this way are looked down upon by their colleagues who have taken the traditional route to judicial office.

In a few civil law countries, such as Sweden, the legal profession is not rigorously bifurcated and everyone within it can easily change roles and arenas.

Specialization
In many countries, lawyers are general practitioners who represent clients in a broad field of legal matters. In others, there has been a tendency since the start of the 20th century for lawyers to specialize early in their careers.

In countries where specialization is prevalent, many lawyers specialize in representing one side in one particular area of the law; thus, it is common in the United States to hear of plaintiffs' personal injury attorneys. Texas offers attorneys the opportunity to receive a board certification through the state's Texas Board of Legal Specialization. To be board certified, attorney applicants undergo a rigorous examination in one of 24 areas of practice offered by the Texas Board of Legal Specialization. Only those attorneys who are "board certified" are permitted to use the word "specialize" in any publicly accessible materials such as a website or television commercial. See Texas Rule 7.02(a)(6).

Organizations

Lawyers in private practice generally work in specialized businesses known as law firms, with the exception of English barristers. The vast majority of law firms worldwide are small businesses that range in size from 1 to 10 lawyers. The United States, with its large number of firms with more than 50 lawyers, is an exception. The United Kingdom and Australia are also exceptions, as the UK, Australia and the U.S. are now home to several firms with more than 1,000 lawyers after a wave of mergers in the late 1990s.

Notably, barristers in England, Wales, Northern Ireland and some states in Australia do not work in "law firms". Those who offer their services to members of the general public—as opposed to those working "in-house" — are required to be self-employed. Most work in groupings known as "sets" or "chambers", where some administrative and marketing costs are shared. An important effect of this different organizational structure is that there is no conflict of interest where barristers in the same chambers work for opposing sides in a case, and in some specialized chambers this is commonplace. Where lawyer will decide to work is largely down to the remuneration that they will receive. Trainee lawyer salaries vary widely throughout the UK, with their location having a big impact on their pay.

Some large businesses employ their own legal staff in a legal department, e.g. the BBC's Legal Team in the UK, and Molson Coors in Canada. Other organizations buy in legal services from outside companies.

Professional associations and regulation

Mandatory licensing and membership in professional organizations
In some jurisdictions, either the judiciary or the Ministry of Justice directly supervises the admission, licensing, and regulation of lawyers.

Other jurisdictions, by statute, tradition, or court order, have granted such powers to a professional association which all lawyers must belong to. In the U.S., such associations are known as mandatory, integrated, or unified bar associations. In the Commonwealth of Nations, similar organizations are known as Inns of Court, bar councils or law societies. In civil law countries, comparable organizations are known as Orders of Advocates, Chambers of Advocates, Colleges of Advocates, Faculties of Advocates, or similar names. Generally, a nonmember caught practicing law may be liable for the crime of unauthorized practice of law.

In common law countries with divided legal professions, barristers traditionally belong to the bar council (or an Inn of Court) and solicitors belong to the law society. In the English-speaking world, the largest mandatory professional association of lawyers is the State Bar of California, with 230,000 members.

Some countries admit and regulate lawyers at the national level, so that a lawyer, once licensed, can argue cases in any court in the land. This is common in small countries like New Zealand, Japan, and Belgium. Others, especially those with federal governments, tend to regulate lawyers at the state or provincial level; this is the case in the United States, Canada, Australia, and Switzerland, to name a few. Brazil is the most well-known federal government that regulates lawyers at the national level.

Some countries, like Italy, regulate lawyers at the regional level, and a few, like Belgium, even regulate them at the local level (that is, they are licensed and regulated by the local equivalent of bar associations but can advocate in courts nationwide). In Germany, lawyers are admitted to regional bars and may appear for clients before all courts nationwide with the exception of the Federal Court of Justice of Germany (Bundesgerichtshof or BGH); oddly, securing admission to the BGH's bar limits a lawyer's practice solely to the supreme federal courts and the Federal Constitutional Court of Germany.

Generally, geographic limitations can be troublesome for a lawyer who discovers that his client's cause requires him to litigate in a court beyond the normal geographic scope of his license. Although most courts have special pro hac vice rules for such occasions, the lawyer will still have to deal with a different set of professional responsibility rules, as well as the possibility of other differences in substantive and procedural law.

Some countries grant licenses to non-resident lawyers, who may then appear regularly on behalf of foreign clients. Others require all lawyers to live in the jurisdiction or to even hold national citizenship as a prerequisite for receiving a license to practice. But the trend in industrialized countries since the 1970s has been to abolish citizenship and residency restrictions. For example, the Supreme Court of Canada struck down a citizenship requirement on equality rights grounds in 1989, and similarly, American citizenship and residency requirements were struck down as unconstitutional by the U.S. Supreme Court in 1973 and 1985, respectively. The European Court of Justice made similar decisions in 1974 and 1977 striking down citizenship restrictions in Belgium and France.

Who regulates lawyers
A key difference among countries is whether lawyers should be regulated solely by an independent judiciary and its subordinate institutions (a self-regulating legal profession), or whether lawyers should be subject to supervision by the Ministry of Justice in the executive branch.

In most civil law countries, the government has traditionally exercised tight control over the legal profession in order to ensure a steady supply of loyal judges and bureaucrats. That is, lawyers were expected first and foremost to serve the state, and the availability of counsel for private litigants was an afterthought. Even in civil law countries like Norway which have partially self-regulating professions, the Ministry of Justice is the sole issuer of licenses, and makes its own independent re-evaluation of a lawyer's fitness to practice after a lawyer has been expelled from the Advocates' Association. Brazil is an unusual exception in that its national Order of Advocates has become a fully self-regulating institution (with direct control over licensing) and has successfully resisted government attempts to place it under the control of the Ministry of Labor.

Of all the civil law countries, Communist countries historically went the farthest towards total state control, with all Communist lawyers forced to practice in collectives by the mid-1950s. China is a prime example: technically, the People's Republic of China did not have lawyers, and instead had only poorly trained, state-employed "legal workers," prior to the enactment of a comprehensive reform package in 1996 by the Standing Committee of the National People's Congress.

In contrast, common law lawyers have traditionally regulated themselves through institutions where the influence of non-lawyers, if any, was weak and indirect (despite nominal state control). Such institutions have been traditionally dominated by private practitioners who opposed strong state control of the profession on the grounds that it would endanger the ability of lawyers to zealously and competently advocate their clients' causes in the adversarial system of justice.

However, the concept of the self-regulating profession has been criticized as a sham which serves to legitimize the professional monopoly while protecting the profession from public scrutiny. Disciplinary mechanisms have been astonishingly ineffective, and penalties have been light or nonexistent.

Voluntary associations
Lawyers are always free to form voluntary associations of their own, apart from any licensing or mandatory membership that may be required by the laws of their jurisdiction. Like their mandatory counterparts, such organizations may exist at all geographic levels. In American English, such associations are known as voluntary bar associations. The largest voluntary professional association of lawyers in the English-speaking world is the American Bar Association.

In some countries, like France and Italy, lawyers have also formed trade unions.

Cultural perception

Hostility towards the legal profession is a widespread phenomenon. For example, William Shakespeare famously wrote, "The first thing we do, let's kill all the lawyers" in Henry VI, Part 2, Act IV, Scene 2. The legal profession was abolished in Prussia in 1780 and in France in 1789, though both countries eventually realized that their judicial systems could not function efficiently without lawyers. Complaints about too many lawyers were common in both England and the United States in the 1840s, Germany in the 1910s, and in Australia, Canada, the United States, and Scotland in the 1980s.

Public distrust of lawyers reached record heights in the United States after the Watergate scandal. In the aftermath of Watergate, legal self-help books became popular among those who wished to solve their legal problems without having to deal with lawyers. Lawyer jokes (already a perennial favorite) also soared in popularity in English-speaking North America as a result of Watergate. In 1989, American legal self-help publisher Nolo Press published a 171-page compilation of negative anecdotes about lawyers from throughout human history.

In Adventures in Law and Justice (2003), legal researcher Bryan Horrigan dedicated a chapter to "Myths, Fictions, and Realities" about law and illustrated the perennial criticism of lawyers as "amoral [...] guns for hire" with a quote from Ambrose Bierce's satirical The Devil's Dictionary (1911) that summarized the noun as: "LAWYER, n. One skilled in circumvention of the law."

More generally, in Legal Ethics: A Comparative Study (2004), law professor Geoffrey C. Hazard, Jr. with Angelo Dondi briefly examined the "regulations attempting to suppress lawyer misconduct" and noted that their similarity around the world was paralleled by a "remarkable consistency" in certain "persistent grievances" about lawyers that transcends both time and locale, from the Bible to medieval England to dynastic China. The authors then generalized these common complaints about lawyers as being classified into five "general categories" as follows:

 abuse of litigation in various ways, including using dilatory tactics and false evidence and making frivolous arguments to the courts
 preparation of false documentation, such as false deeds, contracts, or wills
 deceiving clients and other persons and misappropriating property
 procrastination in dealings with clients
 charging excessive fees

Some studies have shown that suicide rates among lawyers may be as much as six times higher than the average population, and commentators suggest that the low opinion the public has of lawyers, combined with their own high ideals of justice, which in practice they may see denied, increase the depression rates of those in this profession. Additionally, lawyers are twice as likely to suffer from addiction to alcohol and other drugs.

Compensation

In the United States, lawyers typically earn between $45,000 and $160,000 per year, although earnings vary by age, experience, and practice setting.
Solo practitioners typically earn less than lawyers in corporate law firms but more than those working for state or local government.

Lawyers are paid for their work in a variety of ways. In private practice, they may work for an hourly fee according to a billable hour structure, a contingency fee (usually in cases involving personal injury), or a lump sum payment if the matter is straightforward. Normally, most lawyers negotiate a written fee agreement up front and may require a non-refundable retainer in advance. Recent studies suggest that when lawyers charge a fixed-fee rather than billing by the hour, they work less hard on behalf of clients and client get worse outcomes.  In many countries there are fee-shifting arrangements by which the loser must pay the winner's fees and costs; the United States is the major exception, although in turn, its legislators have carved out many exceptions to the so-called "American Rule" of no fee shifting.

Lawyers working directly on the payroll of governments, nonprofits, and corporations usually earn a regular annual salary. In many countries, with the notable exception of Germany, lawyers can also volunteer their labor in the service of worthy causes through an arrangement called pro bono (short for pro bono publico, "for the common good"). Traditionally such work was performed on behalf of the poor, but in some countries it has now expanded to many other causes such as the environment.

In some countries, there are legal aid lawyers who specialize in providing legal services to the indigent. France and Spain even have formal fee structures by which lawyers are compensated by the government for legal aid cases on a per-case basis. A similar system, though not as extensive or generous, operates in Australia, Canada, and South Africa.

In other countries, legal aid specialists are practically nonexistent. This may be because non-lawyers are allowed to provide such services; in both Italy and Belgium, trade unions and political parties provide what can be characterized as legal aid services. Some legal aid in Belgium is also provided by young lawyer apprentices subsidized by local bar associations (known as the pro deo system), as well as consumer protection nonprofit organizations and Public Assistance Agencies subsidized by local governments. In Germany, mandatory fee structures have enabled widespread implementation of affordable legal expense insurance.

History

Ancient Greece
The earliest people who could be described as "lawyers" were probably the orators of ancient Athens (see History of Athens). However, Athenian orators faced serious structural obstacles. First, there was a rule that individuals were supposed to plead their own cases, which was soon bypassed by the increasing tendency of individuals to ask a "friend" for assistance. However, around the middle of the fourth century, the Athenians disposed of the perfunctory request for a friend. Second, a more serious obstacle, which the Athenian orators never completely overcame, was the rule that no one could take a fee to plead the cause of another. This law was widely disregarded in practice, but was never abolished, which meant that orators could never present themselves as legal professionals or experts. They had to uphold the legal fiction that they were merely an ordinary citizen generously helping out a friend for free, and thus they could never organize into a real profession—with professional associations and titles and all the other pomp and circumstance—like their modern counterparts. Therefore, if one narrows the definition to those men who could practice the legal profession openly and legally, then the first lawyers would have to be the orators of ancient Rome.

Ancient Rome
A law enacted in 204 BC barred Roman advocates from taking fees, but the law was widely ignored. The ban on fees was abolished by Emperor Claudius, who legalized advocacy as a profession and allowed the Roman advocates to become the first lawyers who could practice openly—but he also imposed a fee ceiling of 10,000 sesterces. This was apparently not much money; the Satires of Juvenal complained that there was no money in working as an advocate.

Like their Greek contemporaries, early Roman advocates were trained in rhetoric, not law, and the judges before whom they argued were also not law-trained. But very early on, unlike Athens, Rome developed a class of specialists who were learned in the law, known as jurisconsults (iuris consulti). Jurisconsults were wealthy amateurs who dabbled in law as an intellectual hobby; they did not make their primary living from it. They gave legal opinions (responsa) on legal issues to all comers (a practice known as publice respondere). Roman judges and governors would routinely consult with an advisory panel of jurisconsults before rendering a decision, and advocates and ordinary people also went to jurisconsults for legal opinions. Thus, the Romans were the first to have a class of people who spent their days thinking about legal problems, and this is why their law became so "precise, detailed, and technical."

During the Roman Republic and the early Roman Empire, jurisconsults and advocates were unregulated, since the former were amateurs and the latter were technically illegal. Any citizen could call himself an advocate or a legal expert, though whether people believed him would depend upon his personal reputation. This changed once Claudius legalized the legal profession. By the start of the Byzantine Empire, the legal profession had become well-established, heavily regulated, and highly stratified. The centralization and bureaucratization of the profession was apparently gradual at first, but accelerated during the reign of Emperor Hadrian. At the same time, the jurisconsults went into decline during the imperial period.

In the words of Fritz Schulz, "by the fourth century things had changed in the eastern Empire: advocates now were really lawyers." For example, by the fourth century, advocates had to be enrolled on the bar of a court to argue before it, they could only be attached to one court at a time, and there were restrictions (which came and went depending upon who was emperor) on how many advocates could be enrolled at a particular court. By the 380s, advocates were studying law in addition to rhetoric (thus reducing the need for a separate class of jurisconsults); in 460, Emperor Leo imposed a requirement that new advocates seeking admission had to produce testimonials from their teachers; and by the sixth century, a regular course of legal study lasting about four years was required for admission. Claudius's fee ceiling lasted all the way into the Byzantine period, though by then it was measured at 100 solidi. It was widely evaded, either through demands for maintenance and expenses or a sub rosa barter transaction. The latter was cause for disbarment.

The notaries (tabelliones) appeared in the late Roman Empire. Like their modern-day descendants, the civil law notaries, they were responsible for drafting wills, conveyances, and contracts. They were ubiquitous and most villages had one. In Roman times, notaries were widely considered to be inferior to advocates and jury consults.

Middle Ages

After the fall of the Western Roman Empire and the onset of the Early Middle Ages, the legal profession of Western Europe collapsed. As James Brundage has explained: "[by 1140], no one in Western Europe could properly be described as a professional lawyer or a professional canonist in anything like the modern sense of the term 'professional.' " However, from 1150 (when Decretum Gratiani was compiled) onward, a small but increasing number of men became experts in canon law but only in furtherance of other occupational goals, such as serving the Catholic Church as priests. From 1190 to 1230, however, there was a crucial shift in which some men began to practice canon law as a lifelong profession in itself.

The legal profession's return was marked by the renewed efforts of church and state to regulate it. In 1231, two French councils mandated that lawyers had to swear an oath of admission before practicing before the bishop's courts in their regions, and a similar oath was promulgated by the papal legate in London in 1237. During the same decade, the emperor of the Holy Roman Empire Frederick II, the king of the Kingdom of Sicily, imposed a similar oath in his civil courts. By 1250, the nucleus of a new legal profession had clearly formed. The new trend towards professionalization culminated in a controversial proposal at the Second Council of Lyon in 1275 that all ecclesiastical courts should require an oath of admission. Although not adopted by the council, it was highly influential in many such courts throughout Europe. The civil courts in England also joined the trend towards professionalization; in 1275 a statute was enacted that prescribed punishment for professional lawyers guilty of deceit, and in 1280 the mayor's court of the city of London promulgated regulations concerning admission procedures, including the administering of an oath.  And in 1345, the French crown promulgated a royal ordinance which set forth 24 rules governing advocates, of which 12 were integrated into the oath to be taken by them.

The French medieval oaths were widely influential and of enduring importance; for example, they directly influenced the structure of the advocates' oath adopted by the Canton of Geneva in 1816.  In turn, the 1816 Geneva oath served as the inspiration for the attorney's oath drafted by David Dudley Field as Section 511 of the proposed New York Code of Civil Procedure of 1848, which was the first attempt in the United States at a comprehensive statement of a lawyer's professional duties.

Titles

Generally speaking, the modern practice is for lawyers to avoid use of any title, although formal practice varies across the world.

Historically lawyers in most European countries were addressed with the title of doctor, and countries outside of Europe have generally followed the practice of the European country which had policy influence through colonization. The first university degrees, starting with the law school of the University of Bologna (or glossators) in the 11th century, were all law degrees and doctorates. Degrees in other fields did not start until the 13th century, but the doctor continued to be the only degree offered at many of the old universities until the 20th century. Therefore, in many of the southern European countries, including Portugal, Italy and Malta, lawyers have traditionally been addressed as "doctor," a practice, which was transferred to many countries in South America and Macau. The term "doctor" has since fallen into disuse, although it is still a legal title in Italy and in use in many countries outside of Europe.

In French- (France, Quebec, Belgium, Luxembourg, French-speaking area of Switzerland) and Dutch-speaking countries (Netherlands, Belgium), legal professionals are addressed as Maître ..., abbreviated to Me ... (in French) or Meester ..., abbreviated to mr. ... (in Dutch).

The title of doctor has never been used to address lawyers in England or other common law countries (with the exception of the United States). This is because until 1846 lawyers in England were not required to have a university degree and were trained by other attorneys by apprenticeship or in the Inns of Court. Since law degrees started to become a requirement for lawyers in England, the degree awarded has been the undergraduate LL.B. In South Africa holders of a LL.B, who have completed a year of pupillage and have been admitted to the bar may use the title "Advocate", abbreviated to "Adv" in written correspondence. Holders of an LL.B who have completed two years of clerkship with a principal Attorney and passed all four board exams may be admitted as an "Attorney" and refer to themselves as such. Likewise, Italian law graduates who have qualified for the bar use the title "Avvocato", abbreviated in "Avv."

Even though most lawyers in the United States do not use any titles, the law degree in that country is the Juris Doctor, a professional doctorate degree, and some J.D. holders in the United States use the title of "Doctor" in professional and academic situations.

In countries where holders of the first law degree traditionally use the title of doctor (e.g. Peru, Brazil, Macau, Portugal, Argentina), J.D. holders who are attorneys will often use the title of doctor as well. It is common for English-language male lawyers to use the honorific suffix "Esq." (for "Esquire"). In the United States the style is also used by female lawyers.

In many Asian countries, holders of the Juris Doctor degree are also called "博士" (doctor).

In the Philippines and Filipino communities overseas, lawyers who are either Filipino or naturalized-citizen expatriates at work there, especially those who also profess other jobs at the same time, are addressed and introduced as either Attorney or Counselor (especially in courts), rather than Sir/Madam in speech or Mr./Mrs./Ms. (G./Gng./Bb. in Filipino) before surnames. That word is used either in itself or before the given name or surname.

See also

 Ambulance chasing
 Association of Pension Lawyers
 Avocats Sans Frontières
 Cause lawyer
 Corporate lawyer
 Court dress
 Fiduciary
 Ghost lawyer
 Law broker
 Lawyer-supported mediation
 Legalese
 List of jurists
 Notary public
 Privilege of the predecessors
 Public defender
 Rules lawyer
 Shyster
 Sole practitioner (lawyer) 
 St. Ivo of Kermartin (patron saint of lawyers)
 Trainee solicitor

Notes

External links

 
Legal ethics
Legal professions
Law enforcement
Positions of authority